Somewhere Over My Head is the second extended play (EP) by American singer Greyson Chance. The EP was released on 13 May 2016 through his own independent label, Greyson Chance Music, and Universal Music.

Singles 
Chance released three singles from the EP. The first single, "Afterlife", was released on October 29, 2015. "Hit & Run" was released as the second single on February 5, 2016. The third and final single, "Back on the Wall", was released on April 29, 2016. On February 1, 2016, Chance performed songs from his EP live in The Studio at Webster Hall in New York City.

Track listing

Charts

Release history

References

2016 EPs
Greyson Chance albums